The Royal Marine VSV is a Very Slender Vessel in British service.

A small number of the craft were built for service with the Royal Marines and Special Boat Service. They were built in two versions, known as the VSV 16m 145 class and the follow-up version, the VSV 22m.

References 

Royal Marines